A power-sharing Northern Ireland Executive was formed following the Northern Ireland Assembly elections of 1973. The executive served as the devolved government of Northern Ireland from 1 January 1974 until its collapse on 28 May 1974.

History

Elections to a Northern Ireland Assembly were held on 28 June 1973. On 21 November, the Sunningdale Agreement was reached on a voluntary coalition of pro-agreement parties, and the Executive took office on 1 January 1974. Prominent members of the executive included former Ulster Unionist Party Prime Minister Brian Faulkner as Chief Executive, then Social Democratic and Labour Party (SDLP) leader Gerry Fitt as Deputy Chief Executive, future Nobel Laureate and SDLP leader John Hume as Minister for Commerce and then leader of the Alliance Party of Northern Ireland Oliver Napier as Legal Minister and head of the Office of Law Reform.

The UUP was deeply divided; its Standing Committee voted to participate in the executive by a margin of only 132 to 105. Since the partition of Ireland, unionists had been opposed to sharing power with the Irish nationalist minority and the end of majoritarianism caused great strife in the UUP. Other contentious issues were internment, policing and the question of the planned Council of Ireland.

After opposition from within the UUP and the Ulster Workers' Council strike, the executive and Assembly collapsed on 28 May 1974 when Faulkner resigned as Chief Executive.

Chief Executive
In January 1974 Brian Faulkner became Chief Executive in the power-sharing executive with the SDLP and the non-sectarian Alliance Party, a political alliance cemented at the Sunningdale Conference that year. After opposition from within the UUP and the Ulster Workers Council Strike, the executive and assembly collapsed on 28 May 1974 when Faulkner resigned as Chief Executive. Brian Faulkner would later then form his own political party known as the Unionist Party of Northern Ireland. They contested the 1975 Constitutional Convention Elections in which they got only 5 seats and no new Chief Executive was elected to replace Brian Faulkner.

1974 Executive of Northern Ireland

See also
 Northern Ireland Assembly (1973)
 Members of the Northern Ireland Assembly elected in 1973
 1973 Northern Ireland Assembly election
 History of Northern Ireland

Northern Ireland Assembly (1973)
Government of Northern Ireland
The Troubles (Northern Ireland)
1974 establishments in Northern Ireland
1974 disestablishments in Northern Ireland
1974 in British politics
Ministries of Elizabeth II